Lite-Brite is a toy that was originally marketed in 1967. It consists of a light box with small colored plastic pegs that fit into a panel and illuminate to create a lit picture, by either using one of the included templates or creating a "freeform" image on a blank sheet of black paper.

History
Lite-Brite was invented by Burt Meyer, Dalia Verbickas, and Joseph M. Burck at Chicago toy and game design company Marvin Glass and Associates, which licensed the invention to Hasbro. Meyer led the project, Verbikas posited the idea of using a translucent material to direct colored light, and Burck designed the toy itself. Lite-Brite was named one of the top 100 toys of all time by Time magazine and was inducted to the National Toy Hall of Fame in 2022.

Description
Lite-Brite allows the artist to create a glowing picture by punching multi-colored translucent plastic pegs through opaque black paper. Using a standard light bulb, the light is blocked by the black paper except where the pegs conduct the light. When lit, the pegs have an appearance similar to that of LEDs.

There are eight peg colors: red, blue, orange, white (clear/colorless), green, yellow, pink, and violet (purple). In the event that pegs were lost or damaged, Hasbro provided refills and/or new colors. 

Because punching the pegs in punches out the letters, each sheet can be used only once. Color-by-letter templates were sold with the set so that children could create characters from licensed works including Mickey Mouse, Scooby-Doo, My Little Pony, and Transformers among others. Blank black sheets were also available for those who wanted to create their own image.

Changes
Over the years, Lite-Brite was offered in different forms including a flat-screen version, a 3D cube, and an FX edition that spins and plays music. The Lite-Brite LED Flat Screen currently sells at MSRP $10, comes in several colors, is LED lit, and is portable, running on three AA batteries. The Lite-Brite 3D cube (called the Four-Share Cube) is a LED-lit four-sided cube that allowed children to play with friends or save three of their designs. The FX Edition is no longer on Hasbro's website. The website has SUN 'N NITE BRITE Sets priced at $10 MSRP and running on three AAA batteries.

Future
There are various websites online that host virtual Lite-Brite games.

See also
 Dot-S
 Making Things with Light

References

External links
 
 The Lite Brite clock

1960s toys
1970s toys
Art and craft toys
Electronic toys
Hasbro products
Products introduced in 1967